William Ralph Maiden (March 12, 1928 – May 29, 1976) was an American jazz saxophonist and arranger.

Maiden began on piano at age five and started playing saxophone at 11. He spent most of his career playing in big bands, and while he recorded copiously as a sideman, he never led his own session. He worked with Perez Prado in 1950 and arranged for Maynard Ferguson from 1952 into the 1960s. He played with Charlie Barnet in 1966, and played baritone sax in addition to arranging for Stan Kenton between 1969 and 1973. After this he taught at the University of Maine at Augusta until his death in 1976.

Discography
With Maynard Ferguson
Dimensions (EmArcy, 1954) – as arranger
 A Message from Newport (Roulette, 1958) – as performer and arranger
Swingin' My Way Through College (Roulette, 1959) – as composer, performer and arranger
Maynard Ferguson Plays Jazz for Dancing (Roulette, 1959) – as composer, performer and arranger
Newport Suite (Roulette, 1960) – as composer, performer and arranger
Let's Face the Music and Dance (Roulette, 1960) – as performer and arranger
Maynard '61 (Roulette, 1961) – as performer and arranger
Double Exposure (Atlantic, 1961) with Chris Connor
Two's Company (Roulette, 1961) with Chris Connor
"Straightaway" Jazz Themes (Roulette, 1961) – as performer and arranger
Maynard '62 (Roulette, 1962) – as performer and arranger
Si! Si! M.F. (Roulette, 1962) – as performer
Maynard '63 (Roulette, 1962) – as performer
Message from Maynard (Roulette, 1962) – as performer
 Maynard '64 (Roulette 1959-62 [1963]) – as composer, performer and arranger
The New Sounds of Maynard Ferguson (Cameo, 1963) – as composer, performer and arranger
Come Blow Your Horn (Cameo, 1963)
Color Him Wild (Mainstream, 1965) – as composer, performer and arranger
The Blues Roar (Mainstream, 1965) – as performer and arranger
The Maynard Ferguson Sextet (Mainstream, 1965) – as composer and performer
Stan Kenton and his orchestra live at Brigham Young University(April Fool 1971) - as performer, composer and arranger

References
Scott Yanow, [ Willie Maiden] at Allmusic
Richard Cook & Morton, Brian: The Penguin Guide To Jazz on CD, 6th Edition, London, Penguin, 2002 .

1928 births
1976 deaths
American jazz saxophonists
American male saxophonists
20th-century American saxophonists
20th-century American male musicians
American male jazz musicians